Guilty Men is a 2016 Colombian drama film directed by Iván Gaona. It was selected as the Colombian entry for the Best Foreign Language Film at the 90th Academy Awards, but it was not nominated.

Plot
In rural Santander in 2005, a trucker/DJ  plays a cat-and-mouse game with local paramilitary groups while trying to win back his lover.

Cast
 René Diaz Calderón as René
 Willington Gordillo as Willington
 Leidy Herrera as Mariana

See also
 List of submissions to the 90th Academy Awards for Best Foreign Language Film
 List of Colombian submissions for the Academy Award for Best Foreign Language Film

References

External links
 
 

2016 films
2016 drama films
Colombian drama films
2010s Spanish-language films
2010s Colombian films
Films set in Colombia